A lightbulb joke is a joke cycle that asks how many people of a certain group are needed to change, replace, or screw in a light bulb. Generally, the punch line answer highlights a stereotype of the target group. There are numerous versions of the lightbulb joke satirizing a wide range of cultures, beliefs and occupations.

Early versions of the joke, popular in the late 1960s and the 1970s, were used to insult the intelligence of people, especially Poles ("Polish jokes"). For instance:

Although lightbulb jokes tend to be derogatory in tone (e.g., "How many drunkards..." / "Four: one to hold the light bulb and three to drink until the room spins"), the people targeted by them may take pride in the stereotypes expressed and are often themselves the jokes' originators, as in "How many Germans does it take to change a lightbulb? One, we're very efficient but not funny." where the joke itself becomes a statement of ethnic pride. Lightbulb jokes applied to subgroups can be used to ease tensions between them.

Variations 

Some versions of the joke are puns on the words "change" or "screw", or "light":

Lightbulb jokes may be responses to current events, particularly those related to energy.
For example, the lightbulb may not need to be changed at all due to ongoing power outages. Other lightbulb jokes might be responses to political power current at the time. For instance:

The Village Voice held a $200 lightbulb joke contest around the time of the Iran hostage crisis, with the winning joke being:

Lightbulb jokes can also be about sports, teasing about their team's past, future, etc.

References

Notes
 
 Alan Dundes (1981). "Many Hands Make Light Work or Caught in the Act of Screwing in Light Bulbs". In 
 

Incandescent light bulbs
Joke cycles